France women's national rugby sevens team was champion of Europe in 2007 (European Women's Sevens Championship). They competed at the 2018 Rugby World Cup Sevens, their qualification being determined by their placement in the 2016–17 World Rugby Women's Sevens Series. They met defending champions, New Zealand, in the finals and were defeated 29 - 0.

France qualified for the 2020 Summer Olympics in Tokyo after winning the Final Olympic Qualification Tournament in Monaco. They went undefeated until the gold medal final where they lost to New Zealand 26 - 12.

Tournament history

Summer Olympics

Rugby World Cup Sevens

Rugby X Tournament

Players

Current squad
Squad named for the 2023 World Rugby HSBC Sevens Series in Vancouver from the 3–5 March.

Caps updated to the latest date: 5 March 2023

France's roster of 12 athletes was named on 5 July 2021. Additionally, Joanna Grisez was named as a replacement.

Head coach: Christophe Reigt

Coralie Bertrand
Anne-Cécile Ciofani
Caroline Drouin
Camille Grassineau
Lina Guérin
Fanny Horta
Shannon Izar
Chloé Jacquet
Carla Neisen
Séraphine Okemba
Chloé Pelle
Jade Ulutule

See also
 France Women's Sevens

References

External links
 
 WorldRugby profile

Women's national rugby sevens teams
sevens
women
World Rugby Women's Sevens Series core teams